Education in Bridgeport, Connecticut includes Bridgeport Public Schools, private and religious schools, a college, and a university. Bridgeport is home to the University of Bridgeport, Housatonic Community College, St. Vincent's College and the Yeshiva Gedola of Bridgeport. Gutchess College was a business school which went defunct circa 1920. 

The city's public school system has 30 elementary schools, three high schools, two alternative programs and an interdistrict vocational aquaculture school.  The system has about 23,000 students, making the Bridgeport Public Schools the second largest school system in Connecticut.  The school system employs a staff of more than 1,700.

The Bridgeport public school district is ranked #161 out of the 165 Connecticut school districts. The city has started a school renovation and construction program, with plans for new schools and modernization of existing buildings.

High schools
Bassick High School
Bridgeport International Academy
Central High School, formerly Bridgeport High School
Warren Harding High School
Kolbe Cathedral

Catholic schools
Kolbe Cathedral High School: Bridgeport's sole Catholic high school

Bridgeport is also home to several Catholic primary schools. They are St. Ambrose, the largest of all the Catholic primary schools in Bridgeport, St. Raphaels, St. Augustine, and St. Peters.

Elementary – Middle schools
 Barnum School
 Beardsley School
 Black Rock School
 Blackham School
 Bryant School
Bridgeport Hope School, Private K–8th
 Cesar A. Batalla School
 Classical Studies Academy
 Columbus School
 Cross School
 Curiale School
 Dunbar School
 Edison School
 Hall School
 Hallen School
 High Horizons Magnet School
 Hooker School
 Interdistrict Discovery Magnet School
 Geraldine Claytor Magnet Academy
 Geraldine W. Johnson School
 Jettie S. Tisdale School
 Madison School
 Luis Munoz Marin School 
 Multicultural Magnet School
 Park City Academy
 Park City Magnet School
 Reed School
 Roosevelt School
 Skane Center
 Waltersville School
 Wilbur Cross School
 Winthrop School

Notes

External links
 Bridgeport Public Schools
 State "Strategic School Profile, Bridgeport School District 2005-2006" report
 Bridgeport School District main Web page at Great Schools Web site